The 1955 Railway Cup Hurling Championship was the 29th series of the inter-provincial hurling Railway Cup. Three matches were played between 13 March 1955 and 3 April 1955 to decide the title. It was contested by Connacht, Leinster, Munster and Ulster.

Leinster entered the championship as the defending champions, however, they were defeated by Munster at the semi-final stage.

On 3 April 1955, Munster won the Railway Cup after a 6-08 to 3-04 defeat of Connacht in the final at Croke Park, Dublin. It was their 22nd Railway Cup title overall and their first title since 1953.

Munster's Christy Ring was the Railway Cup top scorer with 3-09.

Results

Semi-finals

Final

Top scorers

Overall

Single game

Sources

 Donegan, Des, The Complete Handbook of Gaelic Games (DBA Publications Limited, 2005).

References

Railway Cup Hurling Championship
Railway Cup Hurling Championship